Kerr Van Cleve Smith (born March 9, 1972) is an American actor known for playing Jack McPhee on The WB drama series Dawson's Creek, Kyle Brody in The WB supernatural drama Charmed, Robert in Freeform's The Fosters and Axel Palmer in My Bloody Valentine 3D. He is also known for portraying Carter Horton in Final Destination (2000). He starred in the movie Where Hope Grows (2014).

Early life
Smith was born in Exton, Pennsylvania, the son of Barbara (Hess) and a father who works as a financial advisor.

He has a sister named Allison. He attended Peirce Middle School and he graduated from Henderson High School in West Chester, Pennsylvania, then studied at the University of Vermont, where he was a member of the Kappa Sigma fraternity. He was also top of his class senior year.

Career
Smith began acting with roles on As the World Turns as Ryder Hughes from 1996 to 1997, the films Final Destination (2000) and a cameo in The Broken Hearts Club (2000), written and directed by Dawson's Creek writer Greg Berlanti and as a guest star in The WB's hit show Charmed as Agent Kyle Brody, a love interest for the fourth sister, Paige.

When he first appeared as Jack McPhee in the second season of the WB's Dawson's Creek, Smith portrayed a 16-year-old high school student; in reality, the actor was 26. Smith was 31 when the series ended its six-year run in 2003. He was the first man to have an on-screen gay kiss on U.S. television, in season three of Dawson's Creek.

In 2002, Kerr Smith starred in the TV film Critical Assembly, alongside Katherine Heigl. The film depicts young activists against trying to stop a catastrophic nuclear explosion.

Smith was the last person ever to be pranked on the original run of the MTV show Punk'd. In 2007, he appeared in several episodes of the popular TV series CSI: NY as Andrew "Drew" Bedford, the 333 stalker. He also played the radio host Ryan Thomas on The CW's drama series Life Unexpected.

Smith guest-starred on the television show NCIS, where he played Jonas Cobb, a naval officer who was the "Port-to-Port Killer," a serial killer who targets Navy personnel. He made his last appearance on the 8th season finale.

As of 2014, Smith plays Robert Quinn on The Fosters. The same year, he starred in the acclaimed movie Where Hope Grows. He also played Frank Cowles in episode X of Criminal Minds.

Smith debuted on CW’s Riverdale, as the principal of Riverdale High, in season 4, replacing Mr. Weatherbee, who “ascended” with the rest of the cult followers known as “The Farm”. His character name was Mr. Honey.

Personal life
Smith married actress Harmoni Everett on June 7, 2003.  He filed for divorce on March 20, 2009. Smith is a certified pilot and enjoys motocross.

Filmography

Film

Television

References

External links
 

1972 births
Male actors from Pennsylvania
American male film actors
American male soap opera actors
American male television actors
Living people
20th-century American male actors
21st-century American male actors
University of Vermont alumni